Bruce A. Fuchs is an American immunologist and health science administrator. He was the director of the Office of Science Education (OSE) at the National Institutes of Health. On October 1, 2013, OSE ceased operations and Fuchs was reassigned. He works as a health science administrator in the Office of Research Infrastructure Programs and oversees programs pertaining to career development. He is the primary contact for F30/F31 and SERCA K01 applications and the Diversity and Re-Entry Supplements. Fuchs' expertise is in immunology and brain immune interactions.

Selected publications

References 

20th-century American biologists
21st-century American biologists
National Institutes of Health people
Living people
Year of birth missing (living people)
American immunologists